Agriculture in Alaska faces many challenges, largely due to the climate, the short growing season, and generally poor soils. However, the exceptionally long days of summer enable some vegetables to attain world record sizes.

Farms

The state of Alaska contains some 500 farms, covering about 830,000 acres in 2015, mainly to the northeast of the state's largest city, Anchorage, in the Matanuska Valley. The farms produce greenhouse and nursery crops, as well as hay (20,000 tons), dairy produce, potatoes (140,000 cwt), and livestock including cattle (11,000 inc. calves in 2016), reindeer, bison, and yak. Cereals in the state include barley (146,000 bushels) and oats (47,000 bushels). Other livestock include chickens, hogs, and sheep. By value, the top livestock commodities in 2015 were milk ($770,000), eggs, and beef in that order.

Alaskan soils
Alaskan soil conditions range from loamy to sandy, with all ranges in between.  In many parts of Alaska, the soil is acidic, and could greatly improve with the introduction of lime or wood ash.  The biomes range from tundra, which is rich in underlying peat moss to taiga, boreal forest, and temperate rain forest.  Because Alaska was once dominated by glaciers, much of the underlying subsurface is glacial till, silt and sand.

The official state soil is the Tanana series, which is shallow, well drained, moderately permeable, and derived from limestone weathering.

See also
Climate of Alaska

References

External links

 University of Alaska Fairbanks Cooperative Extension Service gardening pages
 Alaska Permaculture
 State of Alaska Division of Agriculture
 Interior Soil Testing Program
 Alaska Farmers Markets

 
Alaska culture